The Geneva Declaration may refer to:

 The Declaration of Geneva (medicine)
 The Geneva Declaration on the Future of the World Intellectual Property Organization
 Declaration of the Rights of the Child
 The Geneva Declaration on Armed Violence and Development
 The Geneva Consensus Declaration on Promoting Women's Health and Strengthening the Family
 The Geneva Declaration of 9 November 1918 on establishment of a Yugoslav state